The Roman-Gaul Baths of Entrammes (Thermes gallo-romains d'Entrammes in French) is a complex of Gallo-Roman thermal baths (thermae) in Entrammes, Mayenne, France. The baths were partially incorporated into a church with the hypocaust surviving below the new structure.  The remains were discovered in 1987.

History 
The thermal site was discovered in 1987. Archaeological surveys were done to reassess the church of Saint-Étienne, a building which dates back to Roman times. A hypocaust in good condition was found below the church, confirming the presence of a thermal site of the 2nd century.

Access and conservation
Since 1 September 1988 the baths have been classified as a historical monument by the Ministry of Culture.
Tours are organised by the local tourism office.

Gallery

References

Bibliography 

 Jacques Naveau (2002). Entrammes, Mayenne, les thermes gallo-romains in "Arts, Recherches et créations" (published by Revue 303)
 Jacques Naveau (1992). La Mayenne, 53: carte archéologique de la Gaule
 Jacques Naveau (1991); Les thermes romains d'Entrammes; Société d'archéologie et d'histoire de la Mayenne. Laval

External links

 Bath's page in the Mayenne Site (in French)

Ancient Roman baths in France
Buildings and structures completed in the 2nd century
Monuments historiques of Pays de la Loire
Roman sites in France
Ruins in Pays de la Loire
Tourist attractions in Mayenne
Diablintes